A magic ring is a mythical, folkloric or fictional piece of jewelry, usually a finger ring, that is purported to have supernatural properties or powers. It appears frequently in fantasy and fairy tales. Magic rings are found in the folklore of every country where rings are worn. Some magic rings can endow the wearer with a variety of abilities including invisibility and immortality. Others can grant wishes or spells such as neverending love and happiness. Sometimes, magic rings can be cursed, as in the mythical ring that was recovered by Sigurd from the hoard of the dragon Fafnir in Norse mythology or the fictional ring that features in The Lord of the Rings. More often, however, they are featured as forces for good, or as a neutral tool whose value is dependent upon the wearer.

A finger ring is a convenient choice for a magic item: It is ornamental, distinctive and often unique, a commonly worn item, of a shape that is often endowed with mystical properties (circular), can carry an enchanted stone, and is usually worn on a finger, which can be easily pointed at a target.

History 

Early stories of magical rings date to classical antiquity. Plato, in the second book of The Republic, tells a story about the Ring of Gyges, which conferred invisibility on its wearer. The shepherd Gyges, who found it in a cave, used its power to seduce the queen, kill the king and take his place. Earlier accounts of Gyges, however, who was king of Lydia, make no mention of a magic ring. Magic powers are not generally attributed to rings in ancient Greek legend, although many other magical objects are listed, particularly in the Perseus myth.

Josephus (8.2) repeats an anecdote of one Eleazar who used a magic ring to exorcise demons in the presence of Vespasian.

J.G. Frazer, in his study of magic and superstition in The Golden Bough, has speculated to the effect that rings can serve, in the "primitive mind", as devices to prevent the soul from leaving the body and to prevent demons from gaining entry. A magic ring, therefore, might confer immortality by preventing the soul's departure and thwart the penetration of any harmful magic that might be directed against the wearer. These magical properties inhibiting egress of the soul may explain "an ancient Greek maxim, attributed to [the ancient philosopher and mystic] Pythagoras, which forbade people to wear rings".

Medieval demonology and alchemy
Traditional medieval Arabic and Hebraic demonology both cultivated the legend of the Ring of Solomon, used to control demons and / or djinn. For example, magic rings feature in Arabian Nights, where Judar bin Omar, a fisherman finds the ring of Al-Shamardal, the enchanter and Ma'aruf, the cobbler discovers Shaddád ibn Aad's signet. The powers of both magic rings come from the servant djinn who are magically confined in them. In the story of Aladdin and the Magic Lamp, Aladdin also summons a second djinn from a finger ring given to him by the Maghrabi Magician. By the Renaissance era Solomon's ring had been adopted into Western magic, occultism, and alchemy.

Magic rings are known in medieval Jewish esoteric tradition; they are mentioned in the Talmud and Midrash. Solomon's magical ring had many properties in legend: making him all-knowing, conferring him with the ability to speak with animals, and bearing the special sigil that sealed genies into bottles. A story about King Solomon and a ring is found in the Babylonian Talmud, but rings are more fully discussed in Jewish mystical literature. The power of a ring is in the divine name with which it is inscribed; such rings are used to invoke and command various guardians of heavenly palaces and to gain entrance to those heavens. In the Zohar, God is thought to own and use a signet ring, or, at least, a signet.

Germanic mythology

A small number of Anglo-Saxon finger rings dating to the Viking Age bearing runic inscriptions of apparently magical significance have been discovered in England, such as the Kingmoor Ring and the Bramham Moor Ring. Rings endowed with special properties were significant in pagan Scandinavia. A 10th century pagan Icelandic chieftain had a temple in which an arm ring rested upon an "altar", and upon which all oaths in the district were to be sworn, according to the 13th-century Eyrbyggja Saga.

An early magical ring in European mythology is the arm ring named Draupnir worn by the god Odin. Because its only reported function was to create more gold arm bands every nine days, Draupnir may have been a religious symbol which represented the increasing of wealth. The ring was placed onto Baldr's funeral pyre, but Baldr gave Draupnir back to Hermodr and so the ring was returned to Odin from the land of death.

Another Germanic ring was called Andvarinaut, the famous “Ring of the Niebelungs” from a medieval Icelandic retelling from ancient poetry of the Saga of the Volsungs and The Nibelungenlied. It eventually becomes the property of the hero Siegfried or Sigurd; it is a gold ring that the dwarf Andvari cursed; later, Odin and Loki stole it. This ring was acquired from the dragon Fafnir by Sigurd, when Sigurd killed him, and with possession of the ring, Sigurd inherited its curse.

How the ring Andvarinaut came to be cursed is explained in detail in The Volsunga Saga, as is the elaborate sequence of events of how the curse plays out for Sigurd, involving Sigurd changing shapes with his brother-in-law Gunnar. However, what magical use Andvarinaut might have to make it desirable is never specifically given in the narrative: The curse on it is simply a source of disaster for every person who owns it; its principal characteristic in the story is that nearly everyone wants to get it, except Sigurd, who has got it, but does not understand what it is that he's got.

Medieval romance
Sir Yvain is given a magic ring by a maiden in Chrétien de Troyes' 12th-century Arthurian romance The Knight of the Lion. This finger ring can be worn with the stone on the inside, facing the palm, and then it will make the wearer invisible. The 14th century Middle English Arthurian romance Sir Perceval of Galles has the hero, Perceval, take a ring from the finger of a sleeping maiden in exchange for his own, and he then goes off on a series of adventures that includes defeating an entire Saracen army in a Land of Maidens. Only near the end of this romance does he learn that the ring he was wearing is a magic ring and that its wearer cannot be killed.

Similar rings feature in the 14th century medieval romance Sir Eglamour of Artois and the 12th century Floris and Blancheflour, and in Thomas Malory's Tale of Sir Gareth of Orkney, in his 15th century epic Le Morte d'Arthur, in which Gareth is given a ring by a damsel who lives in Avalon that will render him invulnerable to losing any blood at a tournament.

In the medieval collection of Welsh tales called the Mabinogion, one of the romances – Geraint ab Erbin – has the eponymous character find a ring that grants him the powers of invisibility when worn. The Scottish ballads Hind Horn and Bonny Bee Hom both include a magic ring that turns pale when the person who received it has lost the person who gave it.

Later literature
François Fénelon, Archbishop of Cambrai, developed the motif of a magical invisibility ring in his literary fable History of Rosimund and Braminth. The tale was translated by Andrew Lang as The Enchanted Ring in his Green Fairy Book.

Folklore
In folkloristics, tale type ATU 560, "The Magic Ring", of the international Aarne-Thompson-Uther Index, was named after the magical object the hero receives in the tale.

Modern fiction
Magic rings occur in a myriad of modern fantasy stories as incidental objects, but many novels feature a ring as a central part of the plot. Like other magical objects in stories, magic rings can act as a plot device, but in two distinct ways. They may give magical abilities to a person who is otherwise lacking in them, or enhance the power of a wizard. Or alternatively, they may function as nothing more than MacGuffins, that is, objects for which it is the characters' desire to obtain them, rather than any innate power that they possess, that moves the story along. J.R.R. Tolkien's The Hobbit, for example, involves a magical ring which allows Bilbo Baggins to be instrumental in a quest, matching the abilities of the dwarves. In the Volsunga Saga, on the other hand, the magic ring that Sigurd takes from the dragon Fafnir is a symbolic item, cursed by the dwarf Andvari from whom it was stolen by Loki; the ring is a plot device that creates a sense of inevitable disaster as the story unfolds.

The Ring of the Nibelung

The composer Richard Wagner wrote a series of four operas titled Der Ring des Nibelungen which present his version of the story told in The Nibelungenlied and in Volsunga Saga, as well as the Prose Edda. The operas are more often called The Wagner Ring Cycle in English. In this cycle, the ring of the Nibelung ultimately brings about the downfall of the old gods as Brünnhilde returns the ring, which confers power, back to the Rhinemaidens from whom its gold was stolen in the first place.

The Oz books and other books by L. Frank Baum and followers

There are several magic rings in Baum's opus.  One is in Sky Island, a ring which makes the wearer invisible except when another living creature is touching them. Another is in The Sea Fairies in which a mermaid gives Trot a ring which enables her to call on the mermaids for assistance when necessary. In Glinda of Oz, Glinda equips Dorothy with a magic ring with which she can call to Glinda from long distances, for assistance or rescue.  In Ruth Plumly Thompson's sequel The Cowardly Lion of Oz one character has a magic ring which binds a messenger to fulfill his assignment, and turns him blue and stops him from being able to move, if he betrays the owner. (Unlike many magic rings, this one is activated when the owner takes it off.) In Merry-Go-Round in Oz, a brass ring which a rider of a merry-go-round can grab is also one of the three Circlets of the Kingdom of Halidom, which endows the  people of that kingdom with dexterity and skill, when worn by a member of the Kingdom's royal family.

The Hobbit and The Lord of the Rings
J. R. R. Tolkien's fantasy novel The Hobbit was written as children's fiction, but as the story grew into The Lord of the Rings the matter expanded, borrowing from Germanic and Norse mythology for many of its themes, creatures, and names. Of twenty magical Rings of Power, four are described in some detail: The extremely powerful and dangerous "One Ring" around which the plot revolves; and three rings worn by Gandalf the wizard and the elves Elrond and Galadriel.

Seven Rings of Power were given to the dwarves in an only slightly successful attempt to corrupt them. Humans prove to be more susceptible; each of the nine Nazgûl were once great lords of men who were turned to terrifying wraiths and servants of the Dark Lord Sauron by their respective rings. The sixteen rings ultimately given to dwarves and men were created in a joint effort by the elves and Sauron. The three rings kept by the elves were forged by the elves alone, and Sauron had no direct hand in their creation. Sauron forged the One Ring in secret, with the intention that it would be a "master ring" and give him control over all the other rings, but was not completely successful in this aim.

Only the One Ring makes any appearance in The Hobbit, and then it is only known as a magic ring which makes the wearer invisible; its much larger and darker significance is not revealed until The Lord of the Rings. The history of the Rings of Power is described in its known entirety in The Silmarillion, in "Of the Rings of Power and the Third Age".

The Rose and the Ring
William Makepeace Thackeray's satirical novel The Rose and the Ring features a ring that has the power to make whoever owns it beautiful; its passage from person to person in the novel is an important element of the story.

The Chronicles of Narnia
In The Magician's Nephew, from C.S. Lewis' The Chronicles of Narnia series, two magic rings, which take people to the Wood between the Worlds, a linking room between parallel universes, are central to the story; a yellow ring, when touched, sends a person to the Wood Between the Worlds, while a green ring is used from there to bring that person into a world of their choosing. These rings were created by the magician "Uncle Andrew" by the use of magical dust from Atlantis.

Harry Potter series
The Harry Potter series, by author J. K. Rowling, features a magic ring bearing a coat of arms linked to the Peverell brothers, Harry Potter and Lord Voldemort's ancestors. It becomes one of the most important objects in Harry Potter's world because it contains a fragment of Voldemort's soul, and before it was pried apart by Dumbledore, it held one of the three Deathly Hallows: the Resurrection Stone, which can summon the deceased.

Doctor Who first series
In the longest-running science-fiction series Doctor Who, the First Doctor sometimes used a ring with strange powers, which first appeared in The Web Planet where he used it to control a Zarbi. In Doctor Whos 20th anniversary story The Five Doctors the ring of Rassilon, the legendary founder of Time Lord society, is said to confer immortality. Apparently this is how Rassilon has remained alive. However, when the renegade Time Lord Borusa puts the ring on he is turned to stone, as were others before him. This was a trap by Rassilon for renegade Time Lords.

Others
 In Andre Norton's novel The Zero Stone, the title comes from a ring that has advanced properties. 
 H. Warner Munn has written an award-winning fantasy novel titled Merlin's Ring
 Stephen R. Donaldson has written a long series of fantasy novels about a magic ring of white gold owned by Thomas Covenant. 
 Poul Anderson, in his novel A Midsummer Tempest, has Oberon and Titania give two characters magical rings that will aid them as long as they are true to each other.
 Piers Anthony has written Castle Roogna which includes, as an important part of its plot, a ring which claims – convincingly as it turns out – to be able to grant wishes.
 The ring of Solomon appears in Charles Williams's novel Many Dimensions.
 The protagonist of the Jack Vance story "Liane the Wayfarer" finds a ring which is not a finger ring: it first appears as the size of a bracelet, and can be stretched in size to serve as a magical portal.
 In the cartoon series The Mighty Hercules, Hercules has a magic ring which grants him superpowers.
 In the Tanya Grotter book series, a Russian parody of Harry Potter, the heroine uses a magic ring that bears the voice of her great-grandfather in order to perform spells. Additionally, the other magicians in the series also use rings to perform magic.
 In the light novel and anime series Shakugan no Shana, male lead character Yuji Sakai possesses a ring called Azure which has the ability to nullify the effects of fire, including heat, making the wielder invulnerable to enemies whose main powers are based on flames.
 E. Nesbit's The Enchanted Castle features a magic ring which bears whatever magical properties its owner declares it to have (it is used to turn characters invisible).
 In the Overlord light novel and anime series, each member of Ainz Ooal Gown, and later the floor guardians of the Great Tomb of Nazarick, wears a ring whose use is solely for traveling within the Great Tomb of Nazarick.
 The Ring of Solomon appears in John Bellairs' 1976 novel The Letter, The Witch, and The Ring (book 3 of the Lewis Barnavelt series).
 The Vampire Diaries feature magic rings that allow vampires to walk in the sunlight. In the same series, a non-vampire is given a magic ring to protect him from harm.
 In the TV show So Weird, a magical ring is worn by the main character and seems to be connected to the way she comes across strange and paranormal activity where ever she goes. When the actress playing the main character left the show the ring was passed on to the new main character.
 Solomon's ring appears in the stories featuring the comic book character Seraph.
 In the DC Universe, the members of the Green Lantern Corps wear power rings that have a scientific, not magical, basis. These rings allow the bearer to perform any feat he can imagine, but are limited by his willpower. The Blackest Night story line reveals the existence of similar rings of other colors, powered by other emotions such as greed and hope. The original Green Lantern, Alan Scott fashions a power ring from an ancient lamp that is a concentration of magic energy that the Guardians of the Universe created in an attempt to remove magic from the universe. As a result of this discovery, Scott's ring functions much like the standard Green Lantern rings, except that it cannot directly affect wood.
 Captain Planet and the Planeteers prominently features five magic rings which are given to the central characters by the goddess Gaia.
 Tom and Jerry: The Magic Ring
 In Arifureta: From Commonplace to World's Strongest, the protagonist, Hajime Nagumo, acquired a magic ring that was crafted by a legendary alchemist, allowing him to store his massive arsenal of equipment, such as heavy artillery or vehicles, in another dimension and summon them when needed.
 In Magi: Labyrinth of Magic, Sinbad, who has made contracts with seven of Solomon's genies, uses a ring as the vessel for one of his genies, Zepar, thus creating a magic ring that allows him to use Zepar's magic.
 In the Highschool DxD light novel series, one of the female protagonists, Asia Argento, possess the Sacred Gear Twilight Healing, which is a pair of mystical rings with great healing powers.
 In The Elder Scrolls III: Morrowind, Moon-and-Star is a Dwarven ring of Chimer hero Nerevar. Moon-and-Star played a role in the Nerevarine Prophecies, as it allowed the Nerevarine, the reincarnation of Nerevar, to again unite the Great Houses and Ashlander clans, this time in the battle against the forces of Dagoth Ur.
 In the TV show Hero: Gayab Mode On, A mystical ring that gives power of invisibility, was lost during the fight between the Devatas and the Asuras. Later, the ring was founded by Veer, a young stuntman whose father was a scientist researching on that ring. The ring grants invisibility power to Veer and with that power, he start fighting aliens, who want to take ring back from him, and he also used it to protect the people of his city from the alien attacks, and to search for his father, who has become an Alien / Asur. After rescuing the people of his city he became a superhero known as 'Hero'. Later, the ring gives him more powers like superhuman strength, superhuman speed, healing ability, and other powers at different stages. With the blessings of Lord Shiva, a normal teenanger becomes a superhero.

Video Games
Magical rings frequently appear in video games as items, typically granting special abilities or effects such as stat bonuses.

Footnotes

References

External link

 
Ring
Mythological clothing
Fictional rings (jewellery)
Ring
ATU 560-649